Drombus bontii is a species of goby native to the Indian Ocean from the Bazaruto Archipelago of Mozambique through to the tropical waters of the western Pacific Ocean.  This species can reach a length of  TL.  The status of this species is questionable, with Maurice Kottelat considering it to be a junior synonym of Drombus triangularis.

References

occasional-shrimp goby
occasional-shrimp goby
Fish of Mozambique
Marine fauna of East Africa
Fish of the Indian Ocean
occasional-shrimp goby